is a Japanese otome game published by FuRyu. It was released in Japan on March 14, 2017, for Android and iOS devices. An anime television series adaptation by Studio Deen titled Bakumatsu premiered from October 5 to December 21, 2018.  A second season titled Bakumatsu Crisis premiered from April 4 to June 20, 2019.

Characters

Media

Anime
An anime television series adaptation by Studio Deen titled Bakumatsu aired from October 5 to December 21, 2018. In contrast to the game which is a romance, the anime is a science fiction action-adventure series. The series ran for 12 episodes.

A second season has been announced. The second season, titled Bakumatsu Crisis, premiered from April 4 to June 20, 2019. Mitsutoshi Satō is replacing Masaki Watanabe as director, and Ryo Kawasaki and Go Sakabe are replacing MAGES as music composers. The rest of the staff members and cast are reprising their roles. The opening theme for the second season is "Brave Rejection" by Hi!Superb, while the ending theme is "Homura" by Zwei. The anime is licensed in North America by Crunchyroll, and is streaming as it airs.

Season 1

Season 2

References

Notes

External links
 
 

2018 anime television series debuts
2019 anime television series debuts
2017 video games
Adventure anime and manga
Android (operating system) games
Anime television series based on video games
FuRyu games
IOS games
Japan-exclusive video games
Otome games
Science fiction anime and manga
Studio Deen
Video games developed in Japan